Duanhua (Manchu:  Duwanhūwa; 1807 – 1861) was a Manchu prince and regent of the Qing dynasty.

Life
Duanhua was born in the Manchu Aisin Gioro clan as the third son of Ulgungga (烏爾恭阿), a descendant of Jirgalang, a nephew of Nurhaci (the founder of the Qing dynasty). He descended from the Prince Zheng line, one of the "iron-cap" princely peerages of the Qing dynasty. In 1846, he inherited the title "Prince Zheng of the First Rank" from his father. His family was under the Bordered Blue Banner of the Eight Banners.

Duanhua rose to prominence during the reign of the Xianfeng Emperor. Because of a scandal involving Grand Councilor Mujangga, Duanhua gained the Xianfeng Emperor's trust as a loyal confidant, and became one of the emperor's closest advisors. Duanhua also recommended his brother, Sushun, to serve in the Qing imperial court. During the Second Opium War, Duanhua accompanied the ailing Xianfeng Emperor to Rehe to escape from the foreign invaders.

In 1861, before the Xianfeng Emperor died, he appointed eight regents to assist his successor, the young Tongzhi Emperor, in administrating state affairs. Duanhua and Sushun were among the eight. Later that year, Duanhua and the other seven regents were ousted from power in the Xinyou Coup (辛酉政變) orchestrated by Prince Gong and Empress Dowager Cixi. Duanhua was arrested, imprisoned, and eventually forced to commit suicide.

Family
Father: Ulgungga (乌尔恭阿; 1778–1846)
 Paternal grandfather: Zhihana (枳哈纳), a great-great-great-grandson of Jirgalang
 Paternal grandmother:Lady Zheng, a mistress
Mother: Lady Hugiya (瑚佳氏), Ulgungga's secondary consort 

 Primary consort, of the Niohuru clan, daughter of Fukejing'a (福克京阿), a minister of Western Territories (原任西宁办事处大臣, pinyin:yuanren xining banshi wai dachen)
 Lady
Married Chongqi of the Alute clan and had issue (1 daughter and 1 son)
 Secondary consort, of the Chen clan (陈佳氏), daughter of Sele, a defender general (护军 色勒) 
 Secondary consort, of the Gaogiya clan, daughter of defender general Gaofu (高福 护军)
 Secondary consort, of the Baigiya clan, daughter of defender general Jiaohexing (校和兴 护军)

Ancestry

See also
 Prince Zheng
 Royal and noble ranks of the Qing dynasty
 Ranks of imperial consorts in China#Qing

References

 

1807 births
1861 deaths
19th-century Chinese people
19th-century viceregal rulers
Qing dynasty imperial princes
Prince Zheng
Qing dynasty politicians
Manchu Bordered Blue Bannermen
Forced suicides of Chinese people
Executed Qing dynasty people
People executed by the Qing dynasty
19th-century executions by China